Chun In-gee (born 10 August 1994), also known as In Gee Chun, is a South Korean professional golfer. She was born in Gunsan, North Jeolla Province. She is a three-time major champion, having won the 2015 U.S. Women's Open, the 2016 Evian Championship with a score of 21 under par, which is the lowest winning score in a major tournament for either men or women, and the 2022 Women's PGA Championship.

In 2015, Chun became the first player in history to win majors on three different tours in the same calendar year. On the KLPGA Tour, she won two majors – the Hite Jinro Championship and the KB Financial Star Championship; on the JLPGA Tour, she also won two majors – the World Ladies Championship Salonpas Cup and the Japan Women's Open Golf Championship; and on the LPGA Tour, she won one major – the U.S. Women's Open. By winning the 2016 Evian Championship, she joined compatriot Se Ri Pak as the only two players in LPGA Tour history to win majors as their first two LPGA Tour titles. Chun represented the Republic of Korea (South Korea) at the 2016 Rio Olympics.

Professional wins (15)

LPGA Tour wins (4)

1 Co-sanctioned with KLPGA Tour

LPGA Tour playoff record (0–4)

LPGA of Korea Tour wins (10)

Events in bold are KLPGA majors.
1 Co-sanctioned with LPGA Tour

LPGA of Japan Tour wins (2)

Major championships

Wins (3)

Results timeline
Results not in chronological order before 2019.

CUT = missed the half-way cut
NT = no tournament
T = tied

Summary

 Most consecutive cuts made – 9 (2016 British Open – 2018 U.S. Open)
 Longest streak of top 10s – 2 (2016 British Open – 2016 Evian Championship)

LPGA Tour career summary

^ Official as of 5 March 2023
*Includes matchplay and other tournaments without a cut.

World ranking
Position in Women's World Golf Rankings at the end of each calendar year.

^ as of 6 March 2023

Team appearances
Professional
The Queens (representing Korea): 2015
International Crown (representing South Korea): 2016, 2018 (winners)

References

External links

Chun In-gee at the KLPGA Tour official site 

Profile on Seoul Sisters site

South Korean female golfers
LPGA of Korea Tour golfers
Winners of LPGA major golf championships
Olympic golfers of South Korea
Golfers at the 2016 Summer Olympics
Sportspeople from North Jeolla Province
People from Gunsan
1994 births
Living people